Whiteface is a type of performance in which a person wears theatrical makeup in order to make themselves look like a white person. The term is a reversal of the form of performance known as blackface, in which makeup was used by a performer to make themselves look like a black person, usually to portray a stereotype. Whiteface performances originated in the 19th century, and today still occasionally appear in films. Modern usages of whiteface can be contrasted with blackface in contemporary art.

History
The earliest use of the term, noted by the Oxford English Dictionary, is from the New York Clipper in 1870, informing readers that William "Joe" Murphy has given up minstrelsy to "appear on the legitimate boards in white face."

By 1908, actor Dooley Wilson had earned his nickname for his whiteface impersonation of an Irishman singing a song called "Mr. Dooley". 

The OED also lists a 1947 reference to the black actor Canada Lee performing the role of Bosola in The Duchess of Malfi in whiteface.

Examples
 The 1970 film Watermelon Man begins with Godfrey Cambridge playing a whiteface character, who then wakes up one morning to find himself to be black.
 Eddie Murphy performed in whiteface on Saturday Night Live in the 1980s, and appeared in whiteface for minor characters in the films Coming to America, Vampire in Brooklyn and The Nutty Professor.
 The 2006 FX reality television show Black. White. had two families realistically portrayed via makeup as another race: One as blackface, the other whiteface.
 To promote his new album "White People Party Music", Nick Cannon portrayed a character of European descent named Connor Smallnut.
 In the 2004 film White Chicks, Shawn Wayans and Marlon Wayans play two FBI agents who go undercover as young white women by using whiteface.

Comparison to blackface
Blackface is widely considered racist due to its traceable racial links to slavery and racial segregation. For this reason, blackface is heavily condemned in modern art forms, while whiteface is occasionally employed in modern times, usually in a comedic context. Those who defend it as art differentiate it from blackface, often arguing that whiteface does not draw on a legacy of racism in the way that blackface does, hence argue that the intended satire of white lifestyles is not racist. Critics of whiteface condemn it for being hypocritical or a double standard.

References

Further reading
Marvin McAllister, Whiting Up: Whiteface Minstrels and Stage Europeans in African American Performance, Univ of North Carolina Press, 2011, 

African-American cultural history
Blackface minstrelsy
Racism
Ethnic humour